Tetraopes is a genus of longhorn beetles of the subfamily Lamiinae, tribe Tetraopini, containing the following species:

 Tetraopes annulatus LeConte, 1847
 Tetraopes basalis LeConte, 1852
 Tetraopes batesi Chemsak, 1963
 Tetraopes cleroides Thomson, 1860
 Tetraopes comes Bates, 1881
 Tetraopes crassus Chemsak & Noguera, 2004
 Tetraopes crinitus Chemsak & Noguera, 2004
 Tetraopes discoideus LeConte, 1858
 Tetraopes elegans Horn, 1894
 Tetraopes femoratus LeConte, 1847
 Tetraopes huetheri Skillman, 2007
 Tetraopes ineditus Chemsak & Giesbert, 1986
 Tetraopes linsleyi Chemsak, 1963
 Tetraopes mandibularis Chemsak, 1963
 Tetraopes melanurus Schoenherr, 1817
 Tetraopes paracomes Chemsak, 1963
 Tetraopes pilosus Chemsak, 1963
 Tetraopes quinquemaculatus Haldeman, 1847
 Tetraopes skillmani Chemsak & Noguera, 2004
 Tetraopes subfasciatus Bates, 1881
 Tetraopes sublaevis Casey, 1913
 Tetraopes termophilus Chevrolat, 1861
 Tetraopes tetrophthalmus (Forster, 1771) - Red Milkweed Beetle
 Tetraopes texanus Horn, 1878
 Tetraopes thermophilus Chevrolat, 1861
 Tetraopes thoreyi Bates, 1881
 Tetraopes umbonatus LeConte, 1852
 Tetraopes varicornis Laporte, 1840

Extinct species 
 †Tetraopes submersus (Cockerell, 1908)

Some species and their host plants 
 T. annulatus: …........A. sullivantii, A. subverticillata, A. speciosa, A. tuberosa, A. verticillata, A. viridiflorus.
 T. basalis: …...........A. eriocarpa, A. fascicularis, A. speciosa
 T. discoideus: …........A. auriculata, A. curassavica, A. glaucescens, A. linaria, A. subverticillata, A. verticillata
 T. femoratus: …........A. fascicularis, A. hallii, A. hirtella, A. lemmonii, A. meadii, A. speciosa, A. syriaca, A. viridis
 T. huetheri: …..........A. verticillata
 T. linsleyi: …..........A. linaria
 T. mandibularis: …......A. latifolia
 T. melanurus: …........A. capricornis asperula, A. linaris, A. subverticillata, A. tuberosa
 T. paracomes: ........Matelea quirosii
 T. pilosus: …...........A. arenaria, A. tuberosa
 T. quadrimaculatus: …......A. syriaca
 T. quinquemaculatus: ......A. amplexicaulis, A. hirtella
 T. sublaevis: …..........A. erosa
 T. tetrophthalmus: …......A. syriaca
 T. texanus: …............A. hirtella, A. viridiflora, A. viridis

References

Tetraopini
Cerambycidae genera